Safilo Group S.p.A. (acronym of Società Azionaria Fabbrica Italiana Lavorazione Occhiali) is an Italian company that designs, produces and distributes prescription frames, sunglasses, sports eyewear, ski goggles and helmets, and cycling helmets under its own five house brands and 32 licensed brands, including Smith Optics which manufactures military grade eyewear.

Safilo's products are manufactured in its own Italian facilities, with additional plants in Slovenia, the United States and China. Its products are distributed in 130 countries worldwide.

, it was the second largest optical frame and sunglasses company, after Luxottica until 2022 when Kering Eyewear won this second place.

History
A first manufacturing site opened in 1878 to produce lenses and frames in Calalzo di Cadore, in the Venetian Alps. The Safilo name dates back to 1934, when Guglielmo Tabacchi bought this first Italian production site and founded a new eyewear company, today the oldest player in the Italian eyewear industry.

Throughout the years, the group's exports expanded to many European countries, North Africa, the Middle East and South America. During World War II, Safilo was forced to produce only one type of eyewear, a celluloid frame in two colors - amber and reddish Havana brown - that were all sent to Germany.  After the war, exports to other European nations resumed and operations expanded to Rome and Milan with exports beginning to the United States. In 1974, the founder of Safilo died and his sons took over. In the 1970s, Safilo opened sales offices in various European nations, patented the Elasta hinge, and introduced a popular UFO model of sunglasses.

In the 1980s, Safilo developed designer collections and gained full control of the American eyewear company Starline Optical Corp. It subsequently acquired then sunglass-maker Friuli-based Oxsol and was introduced on the Milan Stock Exchange in 1987. In 1989, Safilo started to produce Gucci's eyewear, and extended to more PPR-owned (today Kering) brands such as Yves Saint Laurent, Bottega Veneta and Alexander McQueen.

In the 1990s, Safilo entered the Asian market, in Hong Kong, opened branches in more European nations, South Africa, Japan and Brazil. Safilo Group acquired the American sports eyewear maker Smith Sports Optics, Inc, and Austria's Carrera Optyl.

In May 2001, Safilo's chairman Vittorio Tabacchi (grandson of Safilo's founder) launched a takeover bid to acquire full ownership of the Safilo Group. Still in 2001, the company inaugurated its new centralized warehouse at its Padua headquarters. In 2002, Safilo acquired the Solstice Sunglasses chain in US, which was then sold in 2019 to focus exclusively on the wholesale business model. Roberto Vedovotto was CEO of the Safilo Group from 2002 to 2006 and relieved the group's saddling debt by selling 40% to Crédit Suisse First Boston. The company returned to the Milan Stock Exchange in December 2005. That year, the Safilo Group made $1.1 billion in revenue and produced 2,500 new eyewear designs. Roberto Vedovotto returned to lead Safilo as EO in November 2009.

In January 2019, HAL Holdings N.V., through its subsidiary Multibrands Italy B.V.'s stake in the share capital of Safilo, increased to 49.8%. In 2020, the Safilo Group completed the acquisition of Blenders Eyewear and Privé Revaux, two digitally native brands powered by a strong e-commerce business model. The eyewear group also partnered with The Ocean Cleanup to create sunglasses made with ocean waste plastic.

Safilo owns its private collection about the history of eyewear and of the company.

Eyewear brands
House brands:

Licensed eyewear brands:

See also 

 List of Italian companies

References

External links

Italian brands
Luxury brands
Fashion accessory brands
High fashion brands
Italian companies established in 1934
Manufacturing companies established in 1934
Retail companies established in 1934
Eyewear retailers of Italy
Eyewear companies of Italy
Companies based in Veneto
Multinational companies headquartered in Italy